Tom Rune Andersen (born 18 October 1976), also known by his stage name Galder, is a Norwegian guitarist and vocalist. He is from the small town of Jessheim, north of Oslo. He is a founding member of the melodic black metal band Old Man's Child as well as the lead guitarist in Dimmu Borgir. In 1993, under the stage name Grusom, he, Jardar and Tjodalv created Old Man's Child. On Old Man's Child albums, he has performed vocal work, guitars, bass, and keyboards, though with a full line-up his primary instruments are guitar and keyboards, as well as vocals. He joined Dimmu Borgir in 2000 but has kept Old Man's Child alive.

Galder has also worked with other Norwegian bands such as Dødheimsgard. Member of Dødheimsgard, Aldrahn, wrote some of the lyrics for Old Man's Child demo album In the Shades of Life. He has two sons, Alex and Kevin, who could be read on the credits of Slaves of the World.

Discography 
With Old Man's Child
In the Shades of Life (1994)
Born of the Flickering (1996)
The Pagan Prosperity (1997)
Ill-Natured Spiritual Invasion (1998)
Revelation 666 – The Curse of Damnation (2000)
In Defiance of Existence (2003)
Vermin (2005)
Slaves of the World (2009)

With Dimmu Borgir
Puritanical Euphoric Misanthropia (2001)
World Misanthropy (2002) (DVD)Death Cult Armageddon (2003)In Sorte Diaboli (2007)Abrahadabra (2010)Forces of the Northern Night (2017)Eonian (2018)
With DødheimsgardSatanic Art (1998)

 Videography 
 Behind the Player: Dimmu Borgir'' (DVD, 2010,

Equipment 
ESP Galder Custom V guitar with Pentagram graphic
Ltd Shadow Galder signature guitar
ESP SV series, F Series, and V Series Guitars
Jackson Guitars (former)
Randall Amplification (former)
Peavey Amplification
Marshall amplifiers (former)
ENGL amplifiers (former)
Shure wireless systems
D'addario strings
Dunlop Picks with Pentagram graphic

References 

1971 births
Living people
Dimmu Borgir members
Norwegian heavy metal bass guitarists
Norwegian male bass guitarists
Heavy metal keyboardists
Lead guitarists
Norwegian black metal musicians
Norwegian male singers
Norwegian heavy metal guitarists
Norwegian heavy metal singers
Norwegian multi-instrumentalists
Norwegian rock bass guitarists
Norwegian rock guitarists
Norwegian rock keyboardists
Norwegian rock singers
People from Jessheim
Place of birth missing (living people)
Black metal singers
21st-century Norwegian bass guitarists
Old Man's Child members